Badlands is the second studio album from Christian metalcore band Colossus, released by Facedown Records on September 16, 2014. As with their debut album, Time & Eternal, Colossus worked with Josh Barber on the production of this album.

Reception

Signaling in a four star review by Jesus Freak Hideout, Mark Rice recognizes, "A powerful and quality album all around, and with definite areas of improvement over an already-strong debut, this four-man group from South Dakota is firmly establishing themselves as a force in Christian metalcore." Brody B., indicating in a four star review from Indie Vision Music, realizing, "Colossus have improved in nearly every aspect since their Freshman release, 'Time & Eternal'."

Track listing

Personnel
Adapted from AllMusic.

Colossus
 Alex Gutzmer - Vocals
 Jim Hughes - Engineer, Guitar, Backing Vocals
 Zach Moll - Artwork, Bass
 Israel Wipf - Drums

Additional musicians
 Jack Daniels (War of Ages, Hope for the Dying) - Guitar, Soloist
 Daniel McWhorter (Gideon) - Guest Vocals on track 4

Production
 Zach Alvey - Assistant Engineer
 Josh Barber - Engineer, Producer
 McKinney Botts - Assistant Engineer
 Cameron Brooks - Composer
 Brian Hood - Mastering, Mixing
 Dave Quiggle - Artwork
 Ben "Bob" Turkovic - Assistant Engineer

Charts

References

2014 albums
Colossus (band) albums
Facedown Records albums